The Milwaukee Braves Wall of Honor is an exhibit located at American Family Field in Milwaukee, Wisconsin, that commemorates baseball players who made significant contributions to the Milwaukee Braves Major League Baseball (MLB) team that played in the city from 1953 to 1965. Previously known as the Boston Braves, the National League (NL) team relocated from Boston, Massachusetts, to Milwaukee after the 1952 season. They won the 1957 World Series under manager Fred Haney. After playing 13 seasons at Milwaukee County Stadium, the club moved to Atlanta, Georgia, as the Atlanta Braves after the 1965 season.

The Wall of Honor was established by the Milwaukee Brewers MLB team and the Milwaukee Braves Historical Association in 2004. Each inductee is honored with a bronze plaque bearing their image and a summary of their Braves career, which is affixed to a wall on the third base concourse. As of 2020, nineteen individuals have been inducted.

Inductees

See also
Milwaukee Brewers Wall of Honor

References

External links
Official website

Wall
2004 establishments in Wisconsin
Awards established in 2004
Halls of fame in Wisconsin
Major League Baseball museums and halls of fame